C. metallica may refer to:
 Calliotropis metallica, a sea snail species
 Calliphora metallica, a fly species in the genus Calliphora
 Chamaedorea metallica, a flowering plant species endemic to southern Mexico
 Choreutis metallica, a moth species found in Queensland, Australia
 Cola metallica, a flowering plant species found only in Cameroon

Synonyms
 Coleophora metallica, a synonym for Coleophora amethystinella, a moth species found in the Mediterranean Region from Portugal to Iraq

See also
 Metallica (disambiguation)